Caner Taslaman (born 1968, Istanbul) is a Turkish academic, professor of religious philosophy, Quran researcher and writer known for his works on the Big Bang theory and the structure of the Quran. He is a professor of philosophy at the Yıldız Technical University.

Books 

 Ahlak, Felsefe ve Allah
 Allah, Felsefe ve Bilim
 Allah'ın Varlığının 12 Delili
 Arzulardan Allah'a
 Big Bang ve Tanrı
 Bir Müslüman Evrimci Olabilir mi?
 Evren'den Allah'a
 Evrim Teorisi, Felsefe ve Tanrı
 Kuantum Teorisi, Felsefe ve Tanrı
 Kur'an ve Bilimsel Zihnin İnşası
 Küreselleşme Sürecinde Türkiye'de İslam
 Modern Bilim, Felsefe ve Tanrı
 Terörün ve Cihadın Retoriği
 İslam ve Kadın
 Neden Müslümanım?

References 

Boğaziçi University alumni
Turkish non-fiction writers
1968 births
Living people